Pelagonemertidae is a family of pelagic nemerteans belonging to the order Polystilifera.

Genera
Genera:
 Cuneonemertes Coe, 1926
 Gelanemertes Coe, 1926
 Loranemertes Chernyshev, 1992
 Nannonemertes Wheeler, 1936
 Natonemertes Brinkmann, 1917
 Obnemertes Korotkevich, 1960
 Parabalaenanemertes Brinkmann, 1917
 Pelagonemertes Moseley, 1875
 Probalaenanemertes Brinkmann, 1917

References

Polystilifera
Nemertea families